Bohermore is an area of Galway, Ireland. It got this name as it was the main road into Galway City from the east in medieval times.

The area is known as the location of the large Bohermore Cemetery, also called the "New Cemetery" in the area. It is one of two cemeteries operated by Galway City Council.

Notable people

 Pat O'Shea, author

References

Geography of Galway (city)